Alok Tiwari (born 1 June 1972 om Village Jamuni, Siddharth Nagar District) is a politician from Samajwadi Party.

He is a member of Rajya Sabha from Uttar Pradesh for the term 2012–2018, since the bye-election held in June 2012 due to the death of his father Brij Bhushan Tiwari.

References

Living people
1972 births
Rajya Sabha members from Uttar Pradesh
People from Uttar Pradesh
Samajwadi Party politicians from Uttar Pradesh